Archie (also known as Archie Comics) is an ongoing comic book series featuring the Archie Comics character Archie Andrews. The character first appeared in Pep Comics #22 (cover dated December 1941). Archie proved to be popular enough to warrant his own self-titled ongoing comic book series which began publication in the winter of 1942 and ran until June 2015. A second series began publication in July 2015, featuring a reboot of the Archie universe with a new character design aesthetic and a more mature story format and scripting, aimed for older, contemporary teenage and young adult readers. The printed comic book format is different from the previous publications.

Publication history
Archie first appeared in Pep Comics #22 in 1941 and soon became the most popular character for the comic. Due to his popularity, he was given his own series which debuted in winter 1942 titled Archie Comics. Starting with issue #114, the title was shortened to simply Archie. The series ended with issue #666 (June 2015) to make way for a new series set in Archie Comics' "New Riverdale".

A new volume of Archie debuted in July 2015 as part of the New Riverdale relaunch. It is written by Mark Waid with art by Fiona Staples. Archie Comics Publisher/CEO Jon Goldwater has said that the new series will harken back to the comic's roots by showcasing more edgy and humorous stories as well as present the origins for the character and his friends as well as how the famous love triangle between Archie, Betty, and Veronica began. Fiona Staples left the series after issue #3 while Annie Wu provided artwork for the fourth issue. Veronica Fish was the guest artist for the fifth and sixth issues before being named the regular artist for the series in February 2016. Fish left the series after issue 10 but continued to provide the regular cover art up to issue 12. Thomas Pitilli and Ryan Jampole provided guest artwork for issues 11 and 12 with Joe Eisma being named the new regular artist starting with issue 13. Pete Woods will take over as series artist beginning with issue #18 in March 2017. Woods provided as the artist until #22 in July 2017. Audrey Mok & Kelly Fitzpatrick provided artwork from #23 onward in August 2017.

Volume 1 (1942–2015)

Significant issues

 #429 (Love Showdown, Part 1)

Issue #429 started one of Archie Comics most famous story lines, the Love Showdown where Archie gets a love letter in the mail and Betty and Veronica both swear it wasn't from them. The story was continued in Betty #19, Betty and Veronica #82, and concluded with Veronica #39.

 #600–606 (Archie Marries Veronica/Archie Marries Betty)
In May 2009, Archie Comics released plans for what they would call "The Archie Story Of The Century" and announced that Archie Andrews would ask Veronica Lodge to marry him in Archie Comics # 600, the first issue of a six-part story arc detailing their engagement, marriage and life together. The publishers of Archie Comics did not expect the response they received from readers and longtime fans telling them they made a mistake in Archie's choice. The New York Times later revealed that the whole story would be simply a fantasy and that the first half of the story would show Archie's life with Veronica, and the second half would show his life with Betty.

 #608–609 (The Archies & Josie and the Pussycats)
This two-issue arc follows Archie Andrews and Valerie Smith falling in love when their two bands go on tour together. This is Archie Comics' first interracial relationship.

 #631–634 (Archie Marries Valerie)
The four issue arc follows a potential future where Archie married Valerie Smith and had a daughter with her named Star. It is similar to the Archie Marries Veronica/Archie Marries Betty arc. Issue #634 details a bunch of potential futures where Archie may have married Cheryl Blossom, Sabrina Spellman or Ethel Muggs.

 #641–644 (Archie Meets Glee)
Archie and his friends cross paths with the cast of Glee thanks to one of Dilton's science experiments gone wrong.

 #656 (Here Comes Harper!)
Features the first appearance of Veronica's cousin, Harper, who is physically disabled and needs to use a wheelchair to get around.

Collected editions
Early issues of Archie have been collected into hardcover 'Archive Editions' by Dark Horse Comics, including original games pages and ads. IDW published archival hardback editions titled Archie's Americana which collect key issues from each decade since the 1940s. Similar hardbacks were produced showcasing work by favourite Archie creators.

Some key Archie storylines have also been collected as trade paperbacks.

Dark Horse Archive Editions

IDW Collections

Trade paperbacks

'Best Of' Collections

Volume 2 (2015–2019)

Story
The first issue focuses on Archie's recent split with Betty Cooper due to the "lipstick incident" that everyone is gossiping about trying to find out what it is. It also sets up the eventual formation of The Archies and the arrival of Veronica Lodge.

Reception
IGN gave the first issue a 9.5 out of 10 calling it "a joy in every sense of the word. It's a book that warms you, each turn of the page providing a welcome blast of character and heart." as well as calling it "one of the best new debuts to hit shelves this year." Comic Book Resources said that "the publisher [Archie Comics] has created their best book in years." and that it "is must-read comics for anyone looking for fun, engaging characters and beautifully drawn, on-trend style." Meanwhile, Den of Geek gave it five stars calling Fiona Staples' art "glorious" while saying that Mark Waid "does an impressive job of creating a Riverdale that feels modern and real."

Collected editions
The series has so far been assembled into the following collections:

References

Comics magazines published in the United States
Archie Comics titles
1942 comics debuts
2015 comics endings
2015 comics debuts
Comic book reboots
Magazines established in 1942
Magazines disestablished in 2015
Teen comedy comics
Romantic comedy comics